Aleksandr Mumyga (born 23 July 1982) is a Belarusian sailor. He competed in the Laser event at the 2000 Summer Olympics.

References

External links
 

1982 births
Living people
Belarusian male sailors (sport)
Olympic sailors of Belarus
Sailors at the 2000 Summer Olympics – Laser
Sportspeople from Minsk